Elektrisk Regn is a new wave punk band from Bergen, Norway, founded in 1978. They appeared when new wave started growing in Norway with such bands as De Press, The Aller Værste! and Kjøtt. El-Regn was one of the first bands to introduce the underground genre in Norway.

Biography 
The singer is the well known Dennis Reksten, who works at Bergen's most famous rock pub, Garage. Elektrisk Regn writes Norwegian lyrics and sing in Bergen dialect. Their debut album Steinbyen was released in 1982 and shows that Reksten manages to write both funny and serious lyrics concerning serious themes (some times heavy political themes). Their most famous song is “Naboen er nynazist” (“My neighbour is a neo-Nazi”).

Their second album Kropp uten sjel arrived three years later, but then they had to wait till 2002 before the next album was released. Stein igjen shows that the band still knows how to make great new-wave rock, but they never managed to reach the charts.

They arranged gigs on an irregular basis in Bergen from time to time.

Band members 
Dennis Reksten, synth, guitar, vocal, text and melody (1978 - )
Harald Nilsen, bass (1978 - )
Trond Osland, guitar (1987 - )
Tom Kogstad, percussion (1979 - )
Harald Pallesen, synth, guitar, vocal (1978 - 1982)
Erik Reksten, percussion (1978 - 1979)
Sam Fossbakk, guitar (1981 - 1982)
Ine Tømmerås, vocal, synth (1982 - )
Bjørn Vassbotten, guitar (1982 - 1987)
Rune Kogstad, percussion (1985 - 1987)
Morten Eide, bass (1985 - 1987)
Jan Gunnar Bortheim, guitar (1987 - )
Ragnar "Raggi" Kolstad (2002)

Discography 
 Steinbyen (LP 1982 Apollon Records, Rec 90 CD with extra tracks 1994) 
 Sterkt stoff (LP 1982 Apollon Records)
 Kropp uten sjel (LP 1985)
 Hilsen ElRegn (single 1987)
 Naboen er nynazist (single 1994)
 Stein igjen Rec 90(CD 2002)
 Reprise (CD 2006, soundtrack)

References

External links 
The group at Groove.no
Elektrisk Regn - Naboen Er Nynazist on YouTube

Norwegian new wave musical groups
Musical groups established in 1978
1978 establishments in Norway
Musical groups from Bergen